Gabriele Clarissa Hegerl  (born 9 January 1962) is Professor of Climate System Science at the University of Edinburgh School of GeoSciences. Prior to 2007 she held research positions at Texas A&M University and at Duke University's Nicholas School of the Environment, during which time she was a co-ordinating lead author for the Intergovernmental Panel on Climate Change (IPCC) Fourth and Fifth Assessment Report.

Education 
Hegerl was educated at Ludwig Maximilian University of Munich where she was awarded a PhD in 1991 where her thesis used a numerical solution of the  Navier–Stokes equations using boundary conditions.

Research and career 
Hegerl's research
 in the natural variability of climate and changes in climate due to natural and anthropogenic changes in radiative forcing (such as greenhouse warming, climate effects of volcanic eruptions and changes in solar radiation). Hegerl has also led well-known research on the attribution of modern climate change to anthropogenic greenhouse gas emission.

She led a 2006 study examining climate sensitivity, then commonly accepted as 1.5–4.5K in response to a doubling of atmospheric , to review observational studies suggesting that climate sensitivity could be as much as 7.7K or even exceed 9K. By using large-ensemble energy balance modelling to simulate temperature responses to historic changes in the radiative forcing effect of solar changes, volcanic eruptions and greenhouse gases, and comparing this to climate reconstructions, they produced an independent estimate that climate sensitivity was probably within the range of 1.5–6.2K. In an interview with The Washington Times, Hegerl said "Our reconstruction supports a lot of variability in the past".

She is a co-ordinating lead author on the IPCC Fourth Assessment Report for Working Group I in the chapter on "Understanding and Attributing Climate Change". Her 2006 reconstruction was cited in the chapter on "Paleoclimate" in support of the conclusion that the 20th century was likely to have been the warmest in the Northern Hemisphere for at least 1,300 years.

She was a member of a team which reviewed recent reconstructions of the temperature record of the past 1000 years, and in 2007 published their own reconstruction from proxies, finding that the maximum pre-industrial temperature in 1,000 years had been significantly exceeded by recent instrumental temperatures.

Publications
Hegerl's publications include:
"Annular Modes in the Extratropical Circulation. Part II: Trends",
"Simulation of the influence of solar radiation variations on the global climate with an ocean-atmosphere general circulation", by U Cubasch, R Voss, GC Hegerl, J Waszkewitz, T. J. Crowley – Climate Dynamics, 1997 
"Multi-fingerprint detection and attribution analysis of greenhouse gas, greenhouse gas-plus-aerosol and solar forced climate change", by G. C. Hegerl, K. Hasselmann, U. Cubasch, J. F. B. Mitchell, E. Roeckner, R. Voss and J. Waszkewitz
"Detecting Greenhouse-Gas-Induced Climate Change with an Optimal Fingerprint Method",
"Detection of climate change and attribution of causes", by JFB Mitchell, DJ Karoly, GC Hegerl, FW Zwiers, MR … – Climate Change 2001: The Scientific Basis, 2001
"The Effect of Local Sea Surface Temperatures on Atmospheric Circulation over the Tropical Atlantic"
"On multi-fingerprint detection and attribution of greenhouse gas- and aerosol forced climate change"

Honours and awards
In 2013, she was elected a Fellow of the Royal Society of Edinburgh (FRSE) and in 2017 she was elected a Fellow of the Royal Society (FRS). In 2018 she was made an honorary Doctor of Science by Leeds University. In 2016, Professor Hegerl won the Hans Sigrist Prize "for her groundbreaking scientific work in this year’s prize field, 'The Human Fingerprint on the Earth System'" In 2018 she became a member of the German Academy of Sciences Leopoldina.

References

1963 births
Living people
Duke University faculty
21st-century British women scientists
German climatologists
Women climatologists
Fellows of the Royal Society
Female Fellows of the Royal Society
Fellows of the Royal Society of Edinburgh
Intergovernmental Panel on Climate Change lead authors
Members of the German Academy of Sciences Leopoldina